Elm Point may refer to:

Elm Point, Illinois
Elm Point, Minnesota
Elm Point, Missouri